Scott Yoo (born April 25, 1971) is an American conductor and violinist. He was appointed Chief Conductor and Artistic Director of the Mexico City Philharmonic Orchestra in 2016. He hosts the PBS TV series Now Hear This.

Early life

Yoo was born in Tokyo in 1971. His father was Korean and his mother was Japanese.

Raised in Glastonbury, Connecticut, Yoo began studying the violin at the age of three and performed the Mendelssohn Violin Concerto with the Boston Symphony Orchestra at the age of 12. He studied with Dorothy DeLay and Paul Kantor at the Juilliard School and won the Josef Gingold International Violin Competition in Brazil. He enrolled at Harvard where he studied physics after accidentally breaking his index finger.

Career

In 1994, Yoo participated in the founding of the Metamorphosen Chamber Orchestra, which he conducted at its subscription series at Jordan Hall in Boston and on tour. At age 26 he became the Assistant Conductor of the Dallas Symphony Orchestra, and conducted the San Francisco Symphony, Colorado Symphony, Indianapolis Symphony, Utah Symphony, and New World Symphony. He conducted the St Paul Chamber Orchestra in their Elliott Carter Festival and in his Carnegie Hall debut. In Europe, he conducted the City of London Sinfonia, the Britten Sinfonia, Orchestre Philharmonique de Radio France, the Ensemble orchestral de Paris, Odense Symphony Orchestra and the Estonian National Symphony Orchestra. In Asia, Mr. Yoo led the Yomiuri Nippon Symphony Orchestra  in Tokyo and the Seoul Philharmonic Orchestra and Busan Philharmonic in Korea.

In 2002, Yoo became the Conductor of the Colorado College Summer Music Festival, and Music Director of the San Luis Obispo Mozart Festival in 2005, now called Festival Mozaic.

In 2011, he founded the Medellín Festicámara, bringing underprivileged musicians and international artists together in Medellín, Colombia.

In 2016, Yoo was elected to become the Chief Conductor of the Mexico City Philharmonic Orchestra.

Yoo recorded for Bridge Records, New World, Naxos, and Sony Classical.  In 2019, he recorded two cello concerto albums with the London Symphony Orchestra and Royal Scottish National Orchestra for Sony Music.

In September 2019, Yoo became host and Executive Producer of Now Hear This, a music television program presented by Great Performances, broadcast by the American public television network PBS.  The series was extended to a third season in 2021. The first season included episodes about Vivaldi, Handel, Bach and Scarlatti, and the second season covered Haydn, Schubert, Mozart, and Beethoven.  Now Hear This was nominated for an Emmy Award in 2021.

In 2021 Yoo received an honorary doctorate degree from Colorado College.

Personal life

Yoo is married to flutist Alice Dade, a professor at the University of Missouri . She appeared in several segments of the Now Hear This series on PBS.

Selected discography
 French Cello Concertos, Hee-Young Lim, London Symphony Orchestra, Sony Classical, London 2018, CD.  
 Dvorak and Enesco Cello Concertos, Bion Tsang, Royal Scottish National Orchestra, Sony Classical, Glasgow 2018, CD
 Earl Kim Orchestral Works, RTE National Symphony Orchestra, Naxos, Dublin 2004, CD
 Earl Kim Chamber Music, Metamorphosen Chamber Orchestra, New World Records, Boston 2001, CD
 Mark O’Connor American Seasons, Metamorphosen Chamber Orchestra, Sony Classical, Boston 2001, CD

References

External links
 
 

1971 births
21st-century American conductors (music)
21st-century classical violinists
American classical violinists
American male conductors (music)
American male violinists
Living people
Male classical violinists
21st-century American male musicians
Harvard College alumni
21st-century American violinists